Beyond Silence can refer to:

 Beyond Silence (1960 film), a 1960 documentary film
 Beyond Silence (1996 film), a 1996 German film